The 2014–15 season will be Royal Wahingdoh's first season in the I-League after winning promotion from the I-League 2nd Division in 2014.

Background
Founded in 1946, Royal Wahingdoh was a club that has always mainly played in the lower state levels of Meghalaya. The club was able to make a push in Indian football after Dominic Sutnga joined the club as managing director in 2008. In 2014, after a few years of trying, Royal Wahingdoh was finally able to make the breakthrough and win promotion to the I-League from the I-League 2nd Division for the first time in its history.

Squad

I-League

Table

Matches

2014–15 Indian Federation Cup

References

Royal Wahingdoh F.C.
Royal Wahingdoh FC seasons